The year 1956 in architecture involved some significant events.

Buildings and structures

Buildings opened

 February – Price Tower, Bartlesville, Oklahoma, United States designed by Frank Lloyd Wright.
 February 4 – Theater Münster in Germany, designed by Werner Ruhnau, Harald Deilmann, Max von Hausen and Ortwin Rave.
 April 17 – Council House, Bristol, England, UK, designed by Vincent Harris (begun 1938).
 April 30 – Torre Latinoamericana in Mexico City, Mexico, designed by Augusto H. Alvarez.
 July 31 – Luzhniki Stadium in Moscow, Russia, USSR.

Buildings completed

 Capitol Records Building in Hollywood, California, the world's first round office building, designed by architect Welton Becket.
 S. R. Crown Hall at the Illinois Institute of Technology, Chicago, United States, designed by the current head of IIT's architecture department Mies van der Rohe.
 General Motors Technical Center in Warren, Michigan, United States, designed by Eero Saarinen.
 Latvian Academy of Sciences, Riga, Latvia, designed by Lev Rudnev.
 Maisons Jaoul in the Paris suburb of Neuilly-sur-Seine, designed by Le Corbusier in 1937. 
 Mausoleum of Genghis Khan completed as a cenotaph in Inner Mongolia, People's Republic of China.
 Vidhana Soudha, completed in Bangalore, India, designed by Kengal Hanumanthaiah.
 Bank of England Printing Works at Loughton, designed by Howard Robertson.
 National Pensions Institute, Helsinki, Finland, designed by Alvar Aalto.
 Rødovre Town Hall, Denmark, designed by Arne Jacobsen.
 St Mark's Church (Markuskyrkan), Björkhagen, Stockholm, Sweden, designed by Sigurd Lewerentz.
 Faculty of Letters building at the University of Reading, England, UK, designed by Howard Robertson.
 Rothschild estate cottages, Poplar Meadow, Rushbrooke, Suffolk, England, UK, designed by John Weeks.

Awards
 AIA Gold Medal – Clarence S. Stein.
 Grand Prix de Rome, architecture – Michel Folliasson.
 RIBA Royal Gold Medal – Walter Gropius.

Births
 January 15 – Vitaly Kaloyev, Russian architect and politician
 October 29 – Kazuyo Sejima, Japanese architect
 November – Teresa Borsuk, British architect

Deaths
 February 25 – Philip Tilden, English domestic architect (born 1887)
 May 7 – Josef Hoffmann, Austrian architect and designer (born 1870)
 July 21 – Lionel Bailey Budden, English architect and academic (born 1877)
 September 8 – Oskar Kaufmann, Hungarian-Jewish architect known for his works in Berlin (born 1873)
 November 20 – Joseph Emberton, English modernist architect (born 1889)
 December 21 – Josep Puig i Cadafalch, Catalan Spanish Modernista architect known for his works in Barcelona (born 1867)

References